Hayat Davud Rural District is in the Central District of Ganaveh County, Bushehr province, Iran. At the census of 2006, its population was 10,819 in 2,392 households; there were 12,920 inhabitants in 3,261 households at the following census of 2011; and in the most recent census of 2016, the population of the rural district was 15,177 in 4,204 households. The largest of its 40 villages was Mal-e Qayed, with 4,564 people.

References 

Rural Districts of Bushehr Province
Populated places in Ganaveh County